David Harley is an IT security researcher, author/editor and consultant living in the United Kingdom, known for his books on and research into malware, Mac security, anti-malware product testing and management of email abuse.

Career 
After a checkered career that included spells in music, bar-work, work with the mentally handicapped, retail and the building trade, Harley entered the IT field in the late 1980s, working initially in administration at the Royal Free Hospital in London, and in 1989 went to work for the Imperial Cancer Research Fund (now merged into Cancer Research UK), where he held administrative and IT support roles and eventually moved into full-time security. In 2001 he joined the National Health Service where he ran the Threat Assessment Centre. After leaving the NHS in 2006 to work as an independent consultant, he worked closely with the security company ESET where between 2011 and 2018 he held the position of Senior Research Fellow, working with the Cyber Threat Analysis Center. In 2009 he was elected to the Board of Directors of the Anti-Malware Testing Standards Organization (AMTSO). He stood down in February 2012, when Righard Zwienenberg, president of AMTSO, joined ESET, as the AMTSO bylaws don't allow more than one Board member to represent the same AMTSO member entity. He ran the Mac Virus website, and formerly held an undefined executive role in AVIEN. He is a former Fellow of the British Computer Society: he explained in a blog article  in 2014 that he was dropping his subscriptions to the BCS Institute and (ISC)2 (and therefore would no longer be entitled to continue using the acronyms CISSP, CITP and FBCS), and his reasons for so doing.

In January 2019 he announced that he was no longer working with ESET and was reverting to his former career as a musician, but indicated that he was still available for one-off authoring and editing work. He subsequently contributed content, reviewing and translation for the English edition of the book Cyberdanger by Eddy Willems.

Writing 
Harley was co-author (with Robert Slade and Urs Gattiker) of Viruses Revealed, and technical editor and principal author of The AVIEN Malware Defense Guide for the Enterprise.

He has also contributed chapters to a number of other security-related books, and sometimes writes for specialist security publishers such as Virus Bulletin and Elsevier. He has often presented papers at specialist security conferences including Virus Bulletin, AVAR, and EICAR. Until the end of 2018 he blogged regularly for ESET, and on occasion for Infosecurity Magazine, SC Magazine, (ISC)2, SecuriTeam, Mac Virus, and Small Blue-Green World. His Geek Peninsula metablog lists many of his papers and articles.

Other work 
Some recordings, miscellaneous prose and verse are posted to or linked from his personal blog page.

Miscellaneous prose – some but not all connected to the security industry – is posted to the Miscellaneous Prose page.

Family life 
Harley was born in Shropshire and educated at the Priory Grammar School for Boys, Shrewsbury. He hardly ever talks publicly about his private life, but a biographical article for Virus Bulletin, and the dedications page to Viruses Revealed indicate that he has a daughter. He lives with his third wife in Cornwall, in the UK.

Bibliography 
 (Contributed content and some editing and translation.)
 Volume 3, "E-Mail Threats and Vulnerabilities."
 Chapter 3: "Malicious Macs: Malware and the Mac." Chapter 4: "Malware Detection and the Mac."
 (Editor, technical editor, several chapters.)
 Co-wrote Chapter 5, "Botnet Detection: Tools and Techniques" with Jim Binkley.
 Volume 3, "E-Mail Threats and Vulnerabilities."
 Massmailers: New Threats Need Novel Anti-Virus Measures.
 Co-wrote Chapter 49, "Medical Records Security" with Paul Brusil.
 Revised Chapter 17 "Viruses and Worms", Chapter 18 "Trojans."
 Chapter 17 "Viruses and Worms", Chapter 18 "Trojans."
 Co-Author.

Papers 
Harley published white papers, conference papers and presentations, and on-line articles with or on behalf of ESET between 2006 and 2018. Some previous and subsequent papers, articles and presentations are available from his Geek Peninsula blog.

References

External links 
—home page

Living people
Writers about computer security
British writers
British technology writers
1949 births
People educated at The Priory Boys' Grammar School, Shrewsbury